Sigappu Nada (Tamil) is a Tamil weekly investigative journalism magazine published by R. Prathap Chander. The first issue was published on 20 January 1970.  The web edition of Sigappu Nada was launched in 1 June 2016.

History
Sigappu nada (சிகப்பு நாடா) was founded in Chennai on 20 January 1970 as a monthly, by P. Kailai Mannan. It was an investigative journalism magazine that brings out the scams and crimes inside and outside government.

Name
The magazine is named Sigappu Nada because the most confidential documents of government offices are kept in a file bound with red tape. This secret files and scams in government are issued in Sigappu Nada. It created an impact among corrupt government officials.

Notice issued
According to the Contempt of Courts Act 1971, a notice was issued against the founder of Sigappu Nada (P. Kumaraswamy alias Kalai Mannan) regarding his article about corruption by four judges of Madras High Court in a judgement.

See also
 Tamil Language Magazines
 Tamil Language Media

References

External links
 sigappu nada website

1970 establishments in Tamil Nadu
Magazines established in 1970
Mass media in Chennai
Monthly magazines published in India
News magazines published in India
Tamil-language magazines
Weekly magazines published in India